Everybody's Woman (German: Jedermanns Frau) is a 1924 Austrian silent drama film directed by Alexander Korda and starring María Corda, May Hanbury, and Jeffrey Bernard. A Montmartre flower-seller is transformed into a society lady for a bet. It is also known as The Folly of Doubt.

Production
After making a film The Unknown Tomorrow (1923) in Germany, Korda returned to Vienna with financial backing from Germany's largest studio UFA for a co-production with Sascha-Film. The film was shot during the winter 1923–1924. The outline screenplay was probably written by Korda, based on a Pygmalion theme. The sets were designed by the art director Julius von Borsody and Karl Hartl worked as assistant director. While in Vienna, Maria Corda also appeared in the hit film Moon of Israel (1924) by Michael Curtiz.

Cast
 María Corda as Marie Celeste 
 May Hanbury  as   Herzogin Bella 
 Harry Nestor as Robert Wulfen 
 Artúr Somlay as Herzog Patry Thun 
 Otto Schmöle as Philipp Thun 
 Adolf Weisse as Diener 
 Jeffrey Bernard

References

Bibliography
 Kulik, Karol. Alexander Korda: The Man Who Could Work Miracles. Virgin Books, 1990.

External links

1924 films
Austrian drama films
Austrian silent feature films
Films based on works by George Bernard Shaw
Films directed by Alexander Korda
Austrian black-and-white films
1924 drama films
Films set in Paris
UFA GmbH films
Silent drama films
1920s German-language films